LeConte's sparrow (Ammospiza leconteii), also known as LeConte's bunting, is one of the smallest New World sparrow species in North America.

Description
LeConte's sparrow is a small sparrow with a relatively large head, short grey bill and short pointed tail. It has a buffy yellow-orange face with grey cheeks, and a dark brown crown with a white central stripe. The nape of the neck is lilac grey with chestnut streaks, and the back is streaked with brown and beige. Its belly is off white, while the breast and sides are a buffy orange-yellow with dark brown streaks. The feet and legs are a brownish-pink colour.

Measurements 
The measurements for both sexes are:
 Length: 4.7 in/ 12 cm
 Wingspan: 7.1 in/18 cm
 Weight: 0.4-0.6 oz/ 12-16 g

Similar birds 
LeConte's sparrow is commonly mistaken for other small sparrows, such as the Nelson's sparrow (Ammospiza nelsoni), grasshopper sparrow (Ammodramus savannarum), Henslow's sparrow (Centronyx henslowii), saltmarsh sparrow (Ammospiza caudacuta), and Baird's sparrow. (C. bairdii).

Taxonomy
LeConte's sparrow is a member of the order Passerifomes, which are the perching birds, sometimes less accurately referred to as the songbirds. It is from the family Passerellidae, which is characterized by species of small birds with bills adapted to seed eating.  LeConte's sparrow was placed in the genus Ammodramus in the past and a molecular phylogeny of the related groups identified that genus as being polyphyletic and recommended the group to be split up. This species falls within the genus Ammospiza clade which includes A. maritimus, A. nelsoni, and A. caudacutus, which are the ground-loving sparrows that prefer staying in tall, thick grasses to perching on trees. There has been a recorded case of a LeConte's sparrow that hybridized with a Nelson's sparrow, in June 1949 in Ontario, Canada.

The LeConte's sparrow was first described by John Latham in 1790 but only received a valid binomial name from John James Audubon in 1844. He wrote, "I have named this interesting species after my young friend Doctor Le Conte, son of Major Le Conte, so well known among naturalists, and who is, like his father, much attached to the study of natural history." It is generally believed that he meant John Lawrence LeConte (whose father had been an Army surveyor with the rank of major), although some feel that he was referring to another John LeConte, also a doctor, and John Lawrence's cousin.

Habitat and distribution

Range
LeConte's sparrow breeds in select areas of Canada, such as northeastern British Columbia, across Alberta, Saskatchewan and southern Manitoba as well as central Ontario and into Quebec; and as far south as northern Michigan, Montana and Minnesota. It winters in the southeastern United States; as far west as central Texas and as far north as central Illinois and Missouri.

Habitat
LeConte's sparrow prefers moist open grassy areas with sufficient vegetation cover to provide shelter. Known habitat use includes meadows, fields, crop stubble, shallow marshy edges, prairie, and occasionally fens and lake-shores within the boreal forest. Studies have shown that vegetation seems to have a greater impact on the abundance of this bird than other factors like climate or patch size. Winter et al. (2005) says that it can be found at highest densities in areas with a "moderate amounts of bare ground". Agriculture and drainage of these areas is currently the greatest threat to the LeConte's sparrow.

Behaviour
It is a very secretive bird that prefers to spend most of its time on the ground under the cover of tall grasses. They are typically very difficult to flush, often only flushing at a distance of 1–3 m as they prefer to run across the ground. When they do emerge they rarely fly more than a foot or two above the grass and often descend again within a few meters. Because it is so rarely seen, there are still many gaps in knowledge about the LeConte's sparrow. Nests are often very hard to find, and individuals are more often identified by sound than by sight. For example, one survey of LeConte's sparrows identified 86 males by sound, but only 8 of those males by sight. For the same reason, very few LeConte's have ever been banded. Between 1967 and 1984, only 355 were actually banded, and none were ever re-captured.

Vocalizations
The male's song resembles a grasshopper buzz with a short squeaky introductory note and ending with a short chirp. It is often described as tika-zzzzzzzzzzzz-tik while the call is a short tsip. It is most commonly confused with the song of the Nelson's sparrow. The male generally sings from a concealed location, but can also be seen singing from the top of protruding grass stems, or occasionally in flight.

Diet
Their diet in the summer is mostly insects such as weevils, leafhoppers, leaf beetles, stinkbugs, caterpillars, moths and spiders. During the winter time the main diet consists of seeds of grasses and weeds such as northern dropseed, Indian grass, yellow foxtail, panic-grass, scorpion-grass, little bluestem, and big bluestem.

Reproduction
Mating can start as early as late April but peaks in mid-May. Males will sing from the cover of dense grasses, perched on tall grass or in flight. Clutches range from two to six eggs with four being the most common. Incubation is done solely by the female, though both parents aid in feeding. Incubation lasts an average of 11–13 days. Hatchlings are altricial with dull brown downy patches. Pairs will have one or two broods per year. Due to the secretive nature of this bird little is known about the period of time between hatching and fledging.

Nest
Nests are built by the female and are cup shaped, made from fine grasses and lined with soft grass and hair. They are usually attached to standing grasses or sedges and are built on or close to the ground. Their nests are often parasitized by brown-headed cowbirds (Molothrus ater).

Eggs
Eggs are 18 X 14 mm long and are sub elliptical in shape. Eggs are white with undertones of green, grey or blue; covered in fine brown dots, speckles or splotches usually clustered near large end of egg.

References

Further reading

Book
 Lowther, P. E.. (2005). Le Conte’s sparrow (Ammodramus leconteii). The Birds of North America Online. (A. Poole, Ed.) Ithaca: Cornell Laboratory of Ornithology; Retrieved from The Birds of North American Online database.

Theses
 Doster RH. Ph.D. (2005). Ecology and conservation of wintering migratory birds in early-successional habitats of the lower Mississippi River alluvial valley. University of Arkansas, United States, Arkansas.
 Reynolds MC. M.S. (1997). Effects of burning on birds in mesquite-grassland. The University of Arizona, United States, Arizona.

Articles
 Anderson KS. (1975). 1st Massachusetts Specimen of Le-Contes sparrow. Auk. vol 92, no 1.
 Dale BC, Martin PA & Taylor PS. (1997). Effects of hay management on grassland songbirds in Saskatchewan. Wildlife Society Bulletin. vol 25, no 3. pp. 616–626.
 Dove CJ, Schmidt B, Gebhard C & Leboeuf E. (2001). Late record of Le Conte's sparrow in Florida. Florida Field Naturalist. vol 29, no 3.
 Hanowski JM, Christian DP & Nelson MC. (1999). Response of breeding birds to shearing and burning in wetland brush ecosystems. Wetlands. vol 19, no 3. pp. 584–593.
 Harris B. (1973). Deuel County Notes Specimen Records for Barred Owl and Le-Contes sparrow. South Dakota Bird Notes. vol 26, no 2.
 Igl LD & Johnson DH. (1995). Dramatic increase of Le Conte's sparrow in conversion reserve program fields in the Northern Great Plains. Prairie Naturalist. vol 27, no 2. pp. 89–94.
 Johnson DH & Igl LD. (2001). Area requirements of grassland birds: A regional perspective. Auk. vol 118, no 1. pp. 24–34.
 Maxwell TC, Madden DE & Dawkins RC. (1988). Status of Le Conte's sparrow Ammodramus-Leconteii Emberizidae Wintering in Western Texas USA. Southwestern Naturalist. vol 33, no 3. pp. 373–375.
 Reynolds MC & Krausman PR. (1998). Effects of winter burning on birds in mesquite grassland. Wildlife Society Bulletin. vol 26, no 4. pp. 867–876.
 Richter CH. (1969). The Le Contes sparrow in Northeastern Wisconsin. Passenger Pigeon. vol 31, no 3. pp. 275–277.
 Robbins S. (1969). New Light on the Le Contes sparrow. Passenger Pigeon. vol 31, no 3. pp. 267–274.
 Roberts JP & Schnell GD. (2006). Comparison of survey methods for wintering grassland birds. Journal of Field Ornithology. vol 77, no 1. pp. 46–60.
 Villard MA & Bracken RA. (1989). First Confirmed Breeding Record of Le Conte's sparrow Ammodramus-Leconteii in Eastern Ontario Canada. Canadian Field-Naturalist. vol 103, no 1. pp. 89–90.
 Winter M, Shaffer JA, Johnson DH, Donovan TM, Svedarsky WD, Jones PW & Euliss BR. (2005). Habitat and nesting of Le Conte's sparrows in the northern tallgrass prairie. Journal of Field Ornithology. vol 76, no 1. pp. 61–71.

External links
Le Conte's sparrow species account - Cornell Lab of Ornithology
Le Conte's sparrow - Ammodramus leconteii - USGS Patuxent Bird Identification InfoCenter
"Le Conte's Sparrow: Ephemeral Jewel of the Northern Great Plains" - Northern Prairie Wildlife Research Center

LeConte's sparrow
Birds of Canada
Native birds of the Plains-Midwest (United States)
LeConte's sparrow
Taxa named by John James Audubon